Unums (universal numbers) are a family of formats and arithmetic, similar to floating point, proposed by John L. Gustafson in 2015.  They are designed as an alternative to the ubiquitous IEEE 754 floating-point standard. The latest version (known as posits) can be used as a drop-in replacement for programs that do not depend on specific features of IEEE 754.

Type I Unum 
The first version of unums, formally known as Type I unum, was introduced in Gustafson's book The End of Error as a superset of the IEEE-754 floating-point format. The defining features of the Type I unum format are:
 a variable-width storage format for both the significand and exponent, and
 a u-bit, which determines whether the unum corresponds to an exact number (u = 0), or an interval between consecutive exact unums (u = 1). In this way, the unums cover the entire extended real number line [−∞,+∞].

For computation with the format, Gustafson proposed using interval arithmetic with a pair of unums, what he called a ubound, providing the guarantee that the resulting interval contains the exact solution.

William M. Kahan and Gustafson debated unums at the Arith23 conference.

Type II Unum 
Type II Unums were introduced in 2016 as a redesign of Unums that broke IEEE-754 compatibility.

Posit (Type III Unum) 
In February 2017, Gustafson officially introduced Type III unums, posits for fixed floating-point-like values and valids for interval arithmetic. In March 2021, a standard was ratified and published by the Posit Working Group.

Posits are a hardware-friendly version of unum where difficulties faced in the original type I unum due to its variable size are resolved. Compared to IEEE 754 floats of similar size, posits offer a bigger dynamic range and more fraction bits for values with magnitude near 1 (but fewer fraction bits for very large or very small values), and Gustafson claims that they offer better accuracy. In an independent study, Lindstrom, Lloyd and Hittinger from Lawrence Livermore National Laboratory confirmed that posits out-perform floats in accuracy. Posits have superior accuracy in the range near one, where most computations occur. This makes it very attractive to the current trend in deep learning to minimise the number of bits used. It potentially helps any application to accelerate by enabling the use of fewer bits (since it has more fraction bits for accuracy) reducing network and memory bandwidth and power requirements.

The format of an n-bit posit is given a label of "posit" followed by the decimal digits of n (e.g., the 16-bit posit format is "posit16") and consists of four sequential fields:

 sign: 1 bit, representing an unsigned integer s
 regime: at least 2 bits and up to (n − 1), representing an unsigned integer r as described below
 exponent: up to 2 bits as available after regime, representing an unsigned integer e
 fraction: all remaining bits available after exponent, representing a non-negative real dyadic rational f less than 1

The regime field uses unary coding of k identical bits, followed by a bit of opposite value if any remaining bits are available, to represent an unsigned integer r that is −k if the first bit is 0 or k − 1 if the first bit is 1. The sign, exponent, and fraction fields are analogous to IEEE 754 sign, exponent, and significand fields (respectively), except that the posit exponent and fraction fields may be absent or truncated and implicitly extended with zeroes—an absent exponent is treated as 002 (representing 0), a one-bit exponent E1 is treated as E102 (representing the integer 0 if E1 is 0 or 2 if E1 is 1), and an absent fraction is treated as 0.

The two encodings in which all non-sign bits are 0 have special interpretations:

 If the sign bit is 1, the posit value is NaR ("not a real")
 If the sign bit is 0, the posit value is 0 (which is unsigned and the only value for which the sign function returns 0)

Examples 

Note: 32-bit posit is expected to be sufficient to solve almost all classes of applications.

Quire 
For each positn type of precision , the standard defines a corresponding "quire" type quiren of precision , used to accumulate exact sums of products of those posits without rounding or overflow in dot products for vectors of up to 231 or more elements (the exact limit is ). The quire format is a two's complement signed integer, interpreted as a multiple of units of magnitude  except for the special value with a leading sign bit of 1 and all other bits equal to 0 (which represents NaR). Quires are based on the work of Ulrich W. Kulisch and Willard L. Miranker.

Valid 
Valids are described as a Type III Unum mode that bounds results in a given range.

Implementations 
Several software and hardware solutions implement posits. The first complete parameterized posit arithmetic hardware generator was proposed in 2018.

Unum implementations have been explored in Julia and MATLAB.  A C++ version with support for any posit sizes combined with any number of exponent bits is available. A fast implementation in C, SoftPosit, provided by the NGA research team based on Berkeley SoftFloat adds to the available software implementations.

SoftPosit 
SoftPosit is a software implementation of posits based on Berkeley SoftFloat. It allows software comparison between posits and floats. It currently supports

 Add
 Subtract
 Multiply
 Divide
 Fused-multiply-add
 Fused-dot-product (with quire)
 Square root
 Convert posit to signed and unsigned integer 
 Convert signed and unsigned integer to posit
 Convert posit to another posit size
 Less than, equal, less than equal comparison
 Round to nearest integer

Helper functions 
 convert double to posit
 convert posit to double
 cast unsigned integer to posit

It works for 16-bit posits with one exponent bit and 8-bit posit with zero exponent bit. Support for 32-bit posits and flexible type (2-32 bits with two exponent bits) is pending validation. It supports x86_64 systems. It has been tested on GNU gcc (SUSE Linux) 4.8.5 Apple LLVM version 9.1.0 (clang-902.0.39.2).

Examples 
Add with posit8_t
#include "softposit.h"

int main (int argc, char *argv[]){

    posit8_t pA, pB, pZ;
    pA = castP8(0xF2);
    pB = castP8(0x23);

    pZ = p8_add(pA, pB);

    //To check answer by converting it to double
    double dZ = convertP8ToDouble(pZ);
    printf("dZ: %.15f\n", dZ);

    //To print result in binary (warning: non-portable code)
    uint8_t uiZ = castUI8(pZ);
    printBinary((uint64_t*)&uiZ, 8);

    return 0;
}

Fused dot product with quire16_t
//Convert double to posit
posit16_t pA = convertDoubleToP16(1.02783203125 );
posit16_t pB = convertDoubleToP16(0.987060546875);
posit16_t pC = convertDoubleToP16(0.4998779296875);
posit16_t pD = convertDoubleToP16(0.8797607421875);

quire16_t qZ;

//Set quire to 0
qZ = q16_clr(qZ);

//accumulate products without roundings
qZ = q16_fdp_add(qZ, pA, pB);
qZ = q16_fdp_add(qZ, pC, pD);

//Convert back to posit
posit16_t pZ = q16_to_p16(qZ);

//To check answer
double dZ = convertP16ToDouble(pZ);

Critique
William M. Kahan, the principal architect of IEEE 754-1985 criticizes type I unums on the following grounds (some are addressed in type II and type III standards):
 The description of unums sidesteps using calculus for solving physics problems.
 Unums can be expensive in terms of time and power consumption. 
 Each computation in unum space is likely to change the bit length of the structure. This requires either unpacking them into a fixed-size space, or data allocation, deallocation, and garbage collection during unum operations, similar to the issues for dealing with variable-length records in mass storage.
 Unums provide only two kinds of numerical exception, quiet and signaling NaN (Not-a-Number).
 Unum computation may deliver overly loose bounds from the selection of an algebraically correct but numerically unstable algorithm.
 The benefits of unum over short precision floating point for problems requiring low precision are not obvious.
 Solving differential equations and evaluating integrals with unums guarantee correct answers but may not be as fast as methods that usually work.

See also
 Karlsruhe Accurate Arithmetic (KAA)
 Q (number format)
 Significant figures
 Floating-point error mitigation
 Elias gamma (γ) code
 Tapered floating point (TFP)

References

Further reading
 
 
 
  (NB. PDFs come without notes)
   
 
 
 
 
 
 
  (Roger Stokes' download link)

External links
 
 
 
 

Floating point types
Articles with example C code